The Sydney Jewish Museum is a history museum located in the Sydney suburb of Darlinghurst.  It showcases exhibits relating to the Holocaust, the history and achievements of Jewish people in Australia, and issues of social justice, democracy and human rights in an Australian context.  Emphasis is placed on documenting the lived experiences and individual stories of Holocaust survivors and Jewish-Australians, through the presentation of personal objects and testimonies.

History

Prior usage of the site 
The museum is housed in the historic Maccabean Hall, which was originally built to commemorate the contributions of Jewish community from New South Wales who served in World War I. This building was formally opened on Armistice Day 1923 by Jewish-Australian civil engineer and Australian Army commander General Sir John Monash.  Before it was chosen as the location for the Museum, it had served as a hub for Jewish life in Sydney.

Establishment 
The Sydney Jewish Museum was established in 1992 by the generation of Holocaust survivors who came to Australia. They envisioned the Museum as a place which could hold their stories and personal objects, memorialise those who were murdered during the Holocaust, and within which the lessons from the past would be taught.

The museum was officially opened by Rear Admiral Peter Sinclair , the Governor of New South Wales, on 18 November 1992. The museum was founded by the late John Saunders  and members of the Australian Association of Jewish Holocaust Survivors. Australia has a higher proportion of Holocaust survivors (per capita) than any country except Israel.

Exhibitions 
Within three major exhibition spaces, visitors are able to confront historical artifacts, video footage, new digital technologies and personal stories. The permanent exhibitions include:

Culture and Continuity: Journey through Judaism 
This exhibition on the Museum's Ground Floor explores Jewish history from Biblical origin in the Ancient Near East to the thriving Jewish community in Australia.

Serving Australia: The Jewish Involvement in Australian Military History 
Serving Australia portrays the stories of Jewish servicemen and women in the Australian defence forces from its inception to the present. 

Reflecting the dedication, valour and patriotism of the greater Australian community, this exhibition features the social-military history of Jewish men and women in time of war.

The Holocaust 
Located over three levels, this exhibition traces the persecution and murder of European Jewry from 1933 to 1945 and explores the contemporary and ongoing resonance of these unprecedented events. 

The exhibition also recounts the new lives forged by survivors following their arrival in Australia and their contribution to the rich, multicultural fabric of contemporary Australian life.

The Holocaust and Human Rights 
A capstone to the Holocaust exhibition, The Holocaust and Human Rights Exhibition outlines human rights achievements and challenges, and focuses on the key human rights issues facing Australia today. 

The exhibition uses interactive media and new digital technologies to explore local issues pertaining to the rights of Refugees and Asylum Seekers; People with Disabilities; First Australians; and the LGBTQ+ Community.

The place promotes deep, reflective thought, even on topics that might prove irresolvable.The museum also has a program of regularly changing feature exhibitions.

Resource Centre and Library 
The museum library was created from the entire collection of books donated by Australian Association of Jewish Holocaust Survivors. Since then, the Resource Centre and Library has grown to over 6000 volumes, journals, audio and videotapes, including over 2,500 personal testimonies of Holocaust survivors in Australia. The centre is open to the public during museum hours and staffed by a librarian. The collection provides material for the exhibitions and covers a wide range of themes including antisemitism, war crimes, holocaust in art and literature, and Australian Jewish history.

See also 

 Jewish Holocaust Centre
 Jewish Museum of Australia
 Australian Jews
 History of Jews in Australia
 List of Holocaust memorials and museums in Australia
 Australian Association for Jewish Studies

References

Further reading

External links 

Holocaust museums
Jewish museums
Jews and Judaism in Sydney
Museums in Sydney
1992 establishments in Australia